is a town located in Onga District, Fukuoka Prefecture, Japan.

Education

Facilities
Mizumaki has a train station on the Kagoshima Main Line, and another on the Fukuhoku Yutaka Line at Higashi-Mizumaki, both operated by Kyushu Railway Company (JR Kyushu).

Mizumaki has a public library.

Festivals

History
About 3000 years ago, the large Ko-Onga Bay covered the area where the town of Mizumaki now lies. Soil and silt carried by the Onga River gradually built up until a flat plain was built up in the area. People began living and planting rice crops on that ground. Terrible floods continually plagued the area.

In the year 1889, the village of Mizumaki was formed when nine villages merged. From that time, the population expanded as workers moved in to work in the prosperous coal mines.

In 1940 Mizumaki officially became a town.

Mizumaki was the site of "Japan Coal Mining Company, Onga Coal Mine" which used forced laborers in the mine, particularly Dutch, American and British POWs in World War II. A memorial called "The Memorial Cross "  commemorates the allied POWs who died during the war.

References

External links

Mizumaki official website 
English homepage on official website

Towns in Fukuoka Prefecture